Green Boots is the name given to the unidentified body of a climber that became a landmark on the main Northeast ridge route of Mount Everest. The body has not been officially identified, but he is believed to be Tsewang Paljor, an Indian climber who died on Everest in 1996. The term Green Boots originated from the green Koflach mountaineering boots on his feet.

History

The first recorded video footage of Green Boots was filmed by British film-maker and climber Matt Dickinson in May, 1996. The footage can be viewed at minute mark 42:45 in "Summit Fever Brian Blessed Documentary" (1996). 

Over time, the corpse became known both as a landmark on the north route and for its association with the death of David Sharp. In 2014, Green Boots was moved to a less conspicuous location by members of a Chinese expedition.

Possible identities

Tsewang Paljor
Green Boots is commonly believed to be Indian climber Tsewang Paljor, who was wearing green Koflach boots on the day he and two others in his party attempted to summit in 1996, although it is possible the body may instead have been that of his team member Dorje Morup. Eight climbers died in the Everest disaster of 1996: five climbers from the Adventure Consultants and Mountain Madness expeditions on the southeast route, and three fatalities on the northeast route. The climbers on the northeast route were from the Indo-Tibetan Border Police (ITBP) expedition from India. The expedition was led by Commandant Mohinder Singh and was the first Indian ascent of Everest from the east side.

On 10 May 1996, Subedar Tsewang Smanla, Lance Naik Dorje Morup, and Head Constable Tsewang Paljor were caught in a blizzard, just short of the summit. While three of the six-member team turned back down, Smanla, Morup, and Paljor decided to go for the summit. At around 15:45 Nepal Time, the three climbers radioed to their expedition leader that they had arrived at the top. They left an offering of prayer flags, khatas, and pitons. Here, the leader Smanla decided to spend extra time for religious ceremonies and instructed the other two to move down.

There was no radio contact after that.

Controversy later arose over whether or not a team of Japanese climbers from Fukuoka had seen and potentially failed to assist the missing Indian climbers. Along the way, they encountered others on the trail. Unaware of the missing Indians, they believed these others, all of whom were wearing goggles and oxygen masks under their hoods, were members of a climbing party from Taiwan. During their descent, begun at 15:30, they reported seeing an unidentifiable object above the Second Step. Below the First Step, they radioed in to report seeing one person on a fixed rope. Thereafter, one of the climbers, Shigekawa, exchanged greetings with an unidentifiable man standing nearby. At that time, they had only enough oxygen to return to C6.

At 16:00, the Fukuoka party discovered from an Indian in their group that three men were missing. They offered to join the rescue but were declined. Forced to wait a day due to bad weather, they sent a second party to the summit on 13 May. They saw several bodies around the First Step, but continued to the summit.

Initially, there were some misunderstandings and harsh words regarding the actions of the Fukuoka team, which were later clarified. According to Reuters, the Indian expedition had made claims that the Japanese had pledged to help with the search, but instead had pressed forward with their summit attempt. The Japanese team denied that they had abandoned or refused to help the dying climbers on the way up, a claim that was accepted by the Indian-Tibetan Border Police. Captain Kohli, an official of the Indian Mountaineering Federation, who earlier had denounced the Japanese, later retracted his claim that the Japanese had reported meeting the Indians on 10 May.

Dorje Morup
While it is commonly believed that Green Boots is the body of Head Constable Tsewang Paljor, a 1997 article titled "The Indian Ascent of Qomolungma by the North Ridge", published by deputy leader of the expedition in Himalayan Journal P. M. Das, raises the possibility that it could instead be that of Lance Naik Dorje Morup, aka Dorje. Das wrote that - by the light of their head-torches at 19:30 - two climbers had been spotted descending; although they were soon lost from sight. The next day the leader of the second summit group of the expedition radioed base camp that they had encountered Morup moving slowly between the First and Second Steps. Das wrote that Morup "had refused to put on gloves over his frost-bitten hands" and "was finding difficulty in unclipping his safety carabiner at anchor points." According to Das, the Japanese team assisted in transitioning him to the next stretch of rope.

Sometime later, the Japanese group discovered the body of Tsewang Smanla above the Second Step. On the return trip, the group found that Morup was still making slow progress. Morup is believed to have died in the late afternoon on 11 May. Das states that Paljor's body was never found.

A second ITBP group also came across the bodies of Smanla and Morup on their return from the summit. Das wrote that they encountered Morup "lying under the shelter of a boulder near their line of descent, close to Camp 6" with intact clothing and his rucksack by his side.

Green Boots in perspective
Green Boots joined the ranks of roughly 200 corpses remaining on Everest by the early 21st century. It is unknown when the term "Green Boots" entered Everest parlance. Over the years it became a common term, as all the expeditions from the north side encountered the body of the climber curled up in the limestone alcove cave. The cave is at 27,890 feet (8,500 m) and is littered with oxygen bottles. It is below the first step on the path.

Another fallen climber who earned a nickname, "Sleeping Beauty", is Francys Arsentiev, who died in 1998 during an unsuccessful descent from Everest after summiting. Her body remained where she fell and was visible until 2007, when it was ceremonially hidden from view.

Additional bodies are in "Rainbow Valley", an area below the summit strewn with corpses wearing brightly colored mountaineering apparel. Yet another named corpse is that of Hannelore Schmatz, who, with a prominent position on the south route, earned the moniker "the German woman"; she summited in 1979 but died at 8,200 metres (27,000') altitude during her descent. She remained there for many years but was eventually blown further down the mountain.

In 2006, British mountaineer David Sharp was found in a hypothermic state in Green Boots' Cave by climber Mark Inglis and his party. Inglis continued his ascent after radioing for advice on how to help Sharp, which he was unable to provide. Sharp died of extreme cold some hours later. Approximately three dozen other climbers would have passed by the dying man that day; it has been suggested that those who noticed him mistook Sharp for Green Boots and therefore paid little attention.

Location map

See also
List of people who died climbing Mount Everest
List of unsolved deaths

References

External links
 . Shot starts around 45 second mark.

1996 deaths
Mountaineering deaths on Mount Everest
Mummies
Unidentified decedents
Year of birth unknown
Men in India